The 1976 Wimbledon Championships was a tennis tournament that took place on the outdoor grass courts at the All England Lawn Tennis and Croquet Club in Wimbledon, London, United Kingdom. The tournament was held from Monday 21 June until Saturday 3 July 1976. It was the 90th staging of the Wimbledon Championships, and the second Grand Slam tennis event of 1976. Despite the ongoing drought and heatwave of 1976, the 90th staging of the tournament went ahead as planned. Björn Borg and Chris Evert won the singles title.

Prize money
The total prize money for 1976 championships was £157,740. The winner of the men's title earned £12,500 while the women's singles champion earned £10,000.

* per team

Champions

Seniors

Men's singles

 Björn Borg defeated  Ilie Năstase, 6–4, 6–2, 9–7

Women's singles

 Chris Evert defeated  Evonne Goolagong Cawley, 6–3, 4–6, 8–6

Men's doubles

 Brian Gottfried /  Raúl Ramírez defeated  Ross Case /  Geoff Masters, 3–6, 6–3, 8–6, 2–6, 7–5

Women's doubles

 Chris Evert /  Martina Navratilova defeated  Billie Jean King /  Betty Stöve, 6–1, 3–6, 7–5

Mixed doubles

 Tony Roche /   Françoise Dürr defeated  Dick Stockton /  Rosie Casals, 6–3, 2–6, 7–5

Juniors

Boys' singles

 Heinz Günthardt defeated  Peter Elter, 6–4, 7–5

Girls' singles

 Natasha Chmyreva defeated  Marise Kruger, 6–3, 2–6, 6–1

Singles seeds

Men's singles
  Arthur Ashe (fourth round, lost to Vitas Gerulaitis)
  Jimmy Connors (quarterfinals, lost to Roscoe Tanner)
  Ilie Năstase (final, lost to Björn Borg)
  Björn Borg (champion)
  Adriano Panatta (third round, lost to Charlie Pasarell)
  Guillermo Vilas (quarterfinals, lost to Björn Borg)
  Roscoe Tanner (semifinals, lost to Björn Borg)
  Raúl Ramírez (semifinals, lost to Ilie Năstase)
  Tom Okker (third round, lost to Phil Dent)
  John Newcombe (third round, lost to Bernard Mitton)
  Eddie Dibbs (withdrew before the tournament began)
  Tony Roche (fourth round, lost to Guillermo Vilas)
  Jaime Fillol (third round, lost to Onny Parun)
  Brian Gottfried (fourth round, lost to Björn Borg)
  Jan Kodeš (withdrew before the tournament began)
  Stan Smith (fourth round, lost to Jimmy Connors)

Women's singles
  Chris Evert (champion)
  Evonne Goolagong Cawley (final, lost to Chris Evert)
  Virginia Wade (semifinals, lost to Evonne Goolagong Cawley)
  Martina Navratilova (semifinals, lost to Chris Evert)
  Olga Morozova (quarterfinals, lost to Chris Evert)
  Rosie Casals (quarterfinals, lost to Evonne Goolagong Cawley)
  Sue Barker (quarterfinals, lost to Martina Navrátilová)
  Kerry Reid (quarterfinals, lost to Virginia Wade)

References

External links
 Official Wimbledon Championships website

 
Wimbledon Championships
Wimbledon Championships
Wimbledon Championships
Wimbledon Championships